is a Japanese director, storyboard artist, writer, and animator known for directing and writing several series for studios Gainax and Shaft.

Career
Saeki began working as an in-between animator with Gainax, which was a role that carried on into the series' succeeding films Death & Rebirth and The End of Evangelion. In 1998, the 25th episode of Cyber Team in Akihabara marked his first storyboard credit, and the following year marked his episode director debut and scriptwriting debut with Kare Kano, where at-the-time fellow Gainax director Hiroyuki Imaishi described that the both of them had "learned our chops." In 2002, Saeki served as assistant director under Hiroyuki Yamaga for the second season of Mahoromatic, Mahoromatic: Something More Beautiful, which marked his first work with Shaft. Following Mahoromatic, Saeki made his series directorial debut with the final Gainax/Shaft collaboration series (This Ugly yet Beautiful World (2004) and He Is My Master (2005)). The following years saw Saeki working mainly as a storyboard artist, scriptwriter, and episode director for Shaft and Gainax series, and notably became an essential member of Hiroyuki Imaishi's team on Gurren Lagann. Between 2011 and 2016, Saeki acted as series director for three more projects with Gainax (Wish Upon the Pleiades (2011/2015), Medaka Box (2012), and Omoi no Kakera (2015)). Beginning in 2017, due to Gainax's minimal production output, Saeki began providing storyboards as a freelance artist. After providing storyboards for a few of Shaft's series in that time, he started freelancing as a series director with the studio, where he first directed Assault Lily Bouquet in 2020, and Luminous Witches in 2022.

Works

Television series
 Highlights roles with series directorial duties. Highlights roles with assistant director or supervising duties.

OVAs/ONAs
 Highlights roles with series directorial duties.

Films

Notes

References

External links
 
 

1971 births
Living people
Anime directors
People from Kanagawa Prefecture